The men's pole vault event at the 1965 Summer Universiade was held at the People's Stadium in Budapest on 26 and 28 August 1965.

Medalists

Results

Qualification

Final

References

Athletics at the 1965 Summer Universiade
1965